The Deutsch–Französische Jahrbücher (German–French Annals) was a journal published in Paris by Karl Marx and Arnold Ruge. It was created as a reaction to the censorship of the Rheinische Zeitung.

History and profile
Deutsch–Französische Jahrbücher published only one issue, a double number, appeared in February 1844. Marx's essay On The Jewish Question and the introduction to the manuscript Critique of Hegel's Philosophy of Right were published in this issue. Friedrich Engels also submitted articles to the journal, and publication of Engels' essay "Outlines of a Critique of Political Economy" led to further correspondence between Marx and Engels. 

In the months following publication, Marx was accused by the Prussian government of high treason and lèse-majesté for his writings in the Jahrbücher. The publication was discontinued because of Marx's differences in principle with Ruge and the difficulty of smuggling the periodical into Germany.

See also
Bruno Bauer

References

Deutsch-Französische Jahrbücher in the Encyclopedia of Marxism. Retrieved 2 October 2007.

External links 

 
 
 Deutsch-Französische Jahrbücher; in: Ralf G. Hoerig & Hajo Schmück: Datenbank des deutschsprachigen Anarchismus - DadA Abteilung: Periodika 1798 - 2001 etc. (in German)

Texts
 Marx: "Briefe aus den Deutsch-Französischen Jahrbüchern", Marx-Engels-Werke Bd. 1, pp. 337-346 
 Marx: "Zur Judenfrage", MEW Bd. 1, pp. 347-377, 
 Marx: "Zur Kritik der Hegelschen Rechtsphilosophie. Einleitung", MEW Bd. 1, pp. 378-391
 Engels: "Umrisse zu einer Kritik der Nationalökonomie", MEW Bd. 1, S. 499-524
 Engels: "Die Lage Englands", MEW Bd.1, S. 525-549
 Hess: Letters from Paris
 Heine: Panegyric on King Ludwig
 Deutsch-Französische Jahrbücher at Marxists Internet Archive (in English)

1844 establishments in France
1844 disestablishments in France
Communist magazines
Defunct political magazines published in France
German-language magazines
Magazines published in Paris
Marxist magazines
Magazines established in 1844
Magazines disestablished in 1844